The Pacific Seabird Group (PSG) is an international professional ornithological society based in the US, dedicated to the study and conservation of Pacific seabirds and their environment. The objectives of the Pacific Seabird Group are exclusively scientific, educational, conservational, and nonprofit. In furtherance of these objectives, PSG's principal activities are (1) to increase the amount and quality of scientific research on Pacific seabirds, (2) to educate PSG's members and the general public of the ecology and importance of Pacific seabirds and their environment, (3) to disseminate publications and other information to accomplish this end, and (4) to advocate for the conservation of Pacific seabirds wherever they occur.focusing on the behavior, ecology, and conservation of seabirds.

History
It was founded in 1972, by William R.P. Bourne, Ph.D., James G. King, James C. Bartonek, as an association of professional seabird researchers and managers.  It aims to increase the quality and quantity of seabird research by facilitating information exchange, to assess threats to seabird populations, and to provide government agencies and others with expert advice on managing them.

Organization
The Pacific Seabird Group is governed by an Executive Council, which includes a student representative, and representatives from Alaska/Russia, Washington/Oregon, Northern California, Southern California/Latin America/Hawaii, non-Pacific U.S. states, Canada, Asia/Oceania, and Europe/Africa. Membership on the Executive Council is decided by an annual election by the membership.  Membership is open to "all persons interested in Pacific seabirds and/or their environment."  There are Individual Members, Life Members, Honorary Members, Student Members, Corresponding Members, and Sponsored Members.  Dues are paid annually.

The PSG is a member of the Ornithological Council, the World Seabird Union, and the American Bird Conservancy.

Publications
Pacific Seabirds is a biannual (spring and fall) publication with news and events of interest to the membership.  It continues the Pacific Seabird Group Bulletin.

Since 2000, the PSG has published the open-access, peer-reviewed journal Marine Ornithology on behalf of a consortium of seabird groups from across the world.  Marine Ornithology is published 2-3 times a year, and is the continuation of the African Seabird Group's journal Cormorant.

Annual meeting
Since its inception, the PSG has hosted an annual meeting of members.  In 2008, the first annual meeting outside North America was held in Hakodate, Japan.  The most recent meeting was held in La Jolla California (USA) in February 2023. Dates, venues, and some abstracts of prior meetings can be found on the PSG website.

Awards
At each annual meeting, awards are presented for the best student oral and poster presentations.  A Lifetime Achievement Award and Special Achievement Award may also be presented.

Advocacy
The PSG often comments on government proposals or legal actions concerning seabird conservation issues.  In the past, it has written regarding Marine Protected Areas in the western United States, American white pelican management plans, the eradication of introduced mammals from islands, and decisions on the listing of species in endangered species legislation.

References

Ornithological organizations
Ornithology in the United States
Seabirds
Environmental organizations established in 1972
Scientific organizations established in 1972
1972 establishments in the United States